This is the list of awards received by Hikaru Utada, a Japanese singer-songwriter. She has won numerous awards, including 39 Japan Gold Disc Awards (the 3rd most out of any artist in the event's history), 5 Japan Record Awards, 6 awards from MTV Video Music Awards Japan, and 8 Japan Record Sales Awards.



Awards and nominations

References

Awards
Utada, Hikaru